Michael Haygood Schneider Sr. (born 1943) is a former United States district judge of the United States District Court for the Eastern District of Texas.

Early life and education
Born in San Antonio, Texas, Schneider received an Associate of Arts degree from Lon Morris College in 1963, a Bachelor of Science degree from Stephen F. Austin State University in 1965, and a Juris Doctor from the University of Houston Law Center in 1970.

Legal career
Schneider served as an assistant district attorney in the Harris County, Texas District Attorney's Office from 1971 to 1975, before entering private practice in Texas from 1975 to 1976. He was a general attorney of Dresser Industries from 1976 to 1980, also serving as a municipal judge (part-time) for the City of West University Place, Texas from 1978 to 1990. He was a general attorney of Bawden Drilling, Inc. from 1980 to 1986, and a general solicitor of the Union Pacific Railroad Company from 1986 to 1989, returning to private practice from 1989 to 1990.

Judicial career
Schneider entered into his judicial career as presiding judge of the 157th District, Harris County, from 1990 to 1996, thereafter becoming chief justice of the First Court of Appeals of Texas in Houston, from 1996 to 2002. During that time, he also received a Master of Laws from the University of Virginia Law School in 2001. He was a justice of the Supreme Court of Texas from 2002 to 2004. On May 17, 2004, Schneider was nominated by President George W. Bush to a seat on the United States District Court for the Eastern District of Texas vacated by John H. Hannah Jr. Schneider was confirmed by the United States Senate on September 7, 2004, and received his commission on September 10, 2004. Schneider assumed senior status on January 7, 2016. He retired on October 1, 2016.

References

Sources

1943 births
Living people
Judges of the United States District Court for the Eastern District of Texas
Lon Morris College alumni
People from San Antonio
Stephen F. Austin State University alumni
Texas Republicans
Justices of the Texas Supreme Court
United States district court judges appointed by George W. Bush
21st-century American judges
University of Houston Law Center alumni
University of Virginia School of Law alumni